British Caribbean Airways  was a short lived airline, which in 1986 operated a single BAe 146-100 jet aircraft from Miami, Florida, to Tortola, British Virgin Islands, with an intermediate stop at Providenciales, Turks & Caicos Islands. The British Caribbean flights into Tortola marked the only time this small airport in the BVI had scheduled passenger jet service.

See also
 List of defunct airlines of the United Kingdom

References

Defunct airlines of the United Kingdom
Airlines established in 1986
Airlines disestablished in 1986
1986 establishments in the United Kingdom